Dayle Lymoine Robertson (July 14, 1923February 27, 2013) was an American actor best known for his starring roles on television. He played the roving investigator Jim Hardie in the television series Tales of Wells Fargo and railroad owner Ben Calhoun in Iron Horse. He often was presented as a deceptively thoughtful but modest Western hero. From 1968 to 1970, Robertson was the fourth and final host of the anthology series Death Valley Days. Described by Time magazine in 1959 as "probably the best horseman on television", for most of his career, Robertson played in western films and television shows—well over 60 titles in all.

Early life
Born in 1923 to Melvin and Vervel Robertson in Harrah, Oklahoma, Robertson fought as a professional boxer while enrolled in the Oklahoma Military Academy in Claremore.

During this time Columbia Pictures offered to test Robertson for the lead in their film version of Golden Boy, but Robertson turned down the trip to Hollywood for a screen test.  He didn't want to leave the ponies he was training, nor his home, and the role went to William Holden.

World War II
During World War II, he was commissioned through Officer Candidate School, and served in the United States Army 322nd Combat Engineer Battalion of the 97th Infantry Division in Europe. He was wounded twice and was awarded the Bronze and Silver Star medals.

Career

Early roles
Robertson began his acting career by chance when he was in the United States Army. When he was stationed at San Luis Obispo, California, Robertson's mother asked him to have a portrait taken for her because she didn't have one; so he and several other soldiers went to Hollywood to find a photographer. A large copy of his photo was displayed in his mother's living room window. He found himself receiving letters from film agents who wished to represent him. After the war, Robertson's war wounds prevented him from resuming his boxing career. He stayed in California to try his hand at acting. Hollywood actor Will Rogers Jr., gave him this advice: "Don't ever take a dramatic lesson. They will try to put your voice in a dinner jacket, and people like their hominy and grits in everyday clothes." Robertson thereafter avoided formal acting lessons.

Robertson made his film debut in an uncredited role as a policeman in The Boy with Green Hair (1948). Two other uncredited appearances led to featured roles in two Randolph Scott Westerns:  Fighting Man of the Plains (1949), where he played Jesse James, and  The Cariboo Trail (1950). Popular acclaim to Robertson's brief roles led him to be signed to a seven-year contract to 20th Century Fox. Robertson's first role for Fox was a support part in a Western, Two Flags West (1951). He had a support part in the musical Call Me Mister (1951). He soon advanced to leading roles in films such as Take Care of My Little Girl (1951), where he played Jeanne Crain's love interest, and Golden Girl (1951), where he supported Mitzi Gaynor.

Stardom
Fox gave Robertson top billing in Return of the Texan (1952). He appeared opposite Anne Baxter in The Outcasts of Poker Flat (1952), and starred in the historical adventure Lydia Bailey (1952).

Robertson was never very cooperative with the press, even shunning the powerful columnist Louella Parsons. As a result, he won the press' Sour Apple Award for three years running. But then, commented Robertson, "that dang Sinatra had to hit some photographer in the nose and stop me from getting my fourth."

He was one of several Fox names in O. Henry's Full House (1952) and was Betty Grable's love interest in The Farmer Takes a Wife (1953).

RKO borrowed him for Devil's Canyon (1953) with Virginia Mayo and Son of Sinbad, filmed in 1953 but not released for two more years.

He returned to Fox for City of Bad Men (1953) with Crain; The Silver Whip (1954) with Rory Calhoun and Robert Wagner; and The Gambler from Natchez (1954) with Debra Paget.

Freelancer
Robertson went over to United Artists to star in Sitting Bull (1954), and Top of the World (1955), an adventure film.

Robertson did A Day of Fury (1956) for Universal and Dakota Incident (1956) for Republic, then travelled to Britain for High Terrace (1956).

Television
Tales of Wells Fargo, his best-remembered series, aired on NBC from 1957 to 1961, when it moved to ABC and expanded to an hour-long program for its final season in 1961–1962. The show originally was produced by Nat Holt whom Robertson felt he owed his career to for giving him his first leading roles.Robertson used his own horse, Jubilee, throughout the run of the series.

Robertson also did the narration for Tales of Wells Fargo through which he often presented his own commentary on matters of law, morality, and common sense. He was unique among his television contemporaries, stating that he hated the gun he was forced to carry, but saw it as a necessary evil, a "tool of the trade", and kept practicing.

In its cover story on television westerns, published March 30, 1959, Time reported Robertson was 6 feet tall, weighed 180 pounds, and measured 42–34–34. He sometimes made use of his physique in "beefcake" scenes, such as one in 1952's Return of the Texan where he is seen bare-chested and sweaty, repairing a fence.

In 1960, Robertson guest-starred as himself in NBC's The Ford Show, starring Tennessee Ernie Ford. In 1962, he similarly appeared and sang a perfect rendition of "High Noon" on the short-lived western comedy and variety series The Roy Rogers and Dale Evans Show. In 1963, after Tales of Wells Fargo ended its five-year run, he played the lead role in the first of A.C. Lyles'  Law of the Lawless.

Robertson created United Screen Arts in 1965 which released two of his films, The Man from Button Willow (1965, animated) and The One Eyed Soldiers (1966). Robertson filmed a television pilot about Diamond Jim Brady that was not picked up as a series.

In the 1966–67 season, Robertson starred in Scalplock another television pilot released as a movie that became Iron Horse, in which his character wins an incomplete railroad line in a poker game and then decides to manage the company. In 1968, he succeeded Robert Taylor as the host of Death Valley Days, a role formerly held by Stanley Andrews and future U.S. President Ronald W. Reagan. The series would come to its end, after 19 years on the air, with Robertson's 26 episodes as host. In rebroadcasts, Death Valley Days (often known as Trails West at the time), featured Ray Milland in the role of revised host.

Robertson guest-starred on the November 17, 1969, episode of The Dean Martin Show.

Robertson also guest-starred as himself in the episode "Little Orphan Airplane" of The Six Million Dollar Man in 1974.

Later career
He portrayed legendary FBI agent Melvin Purvis in two made-for-television movies Melvin Purvis: G-Man (1974) and The Kansas City Massacre (1975).

In 1981, Robertson was in the original starring cast of Dynasty, playing Walter Lankershim, a character who disappeared after the first season.

In 1983, Robertson made Big John, another television pilot, where he played a Georgia sheriff who becomes a New York Police Department detective.  In 1987, he starred as the title character on J.J. Starbuck. Robertson also played Frank Crutcher in five episodes of the TV series Dallas during the 1982–83 season. In December 1993 and January 1994, Robertson appeared in two episodes of Harts of the West in the role of Zeke Terrell. During an appearance on The Tonight Show, Robertson said he was of Cherokee ancestry. He joked, "I am the tribe's West Coast distributor."

Robertson played a central part in two episodes of Murder, She Wrote with Angela Lansbury but he was not credited in either appearance.

He received the Golden Boot Award in 1985, has a star on the Hollywood Walk of Fame, and is also in the Hall of Great Western Performers and the National Cowboy & Western Heritage Museum in Oklahoma City.

In 1999, Robertson won the award for film and television from the American Cowboy Culture Association in Lubbock, Texas.

In the last few years before his death, Robertson hosted a radio program called Little Known Facts, which was broadcast on 400 radio stations.

Death
In his later years, Robertson and his wife, the former Susan Robbins, whom he married in 1980, had lived on his ranch in Yukon, Oklahoma, where it was reported he owned 235 horses at one time, with five mares foaling grand champions. Due to his declining health, he relocated to the San Diego area in what would be his final months, passing away at Scripps Memorial Hospital in La Jolla, California, on February 27, 2013, from lung cancer and pneumonia.

TV & Filmography

 The Boy with Green Hair (1948) – Cop (uncredited)
 Flamingo Road (1948) – Tunis Simms (uncredited)
 The Girl from Jones Beach (1949) – Lifeguard (uncredited)
 Fighting Man of the Plains (1950) – Jesse James
 The Cariboo Trail (1950) – Will Gray
 Two Flags West (1950) – Lem
 Call Me Mister (1951) – Capt. Johnny Comstock
 Take Care of My Little Girl (1951) – Joe Blake
 The Secret of Convict Lake (1951) – Narrator (voice, uncredited)
 Golden Girl (1951) – Tom Richmond
 Return of the Texan (1952) – Sam Crockett
 The Outcasts of Poker Flat (1952) – John Oakhurst
 Lydia Bailey (1952) – Albion Hamlin
 Lure of the Wilderness (1952) – Opening off-screen Narrator (voice, uncredited)
 O. Henry's Full House (1952) – Barney Woods (segment "The Clarion Call")
 The Silver Whip (1953) – Race Crim
 The Farmer Takes a Wife (1953) – Dan Harrow
 Devil's Canyon (1953) – Billy Reynolds
 City of Bad Men (1953) – Brett Stanton
 The Gambler From Natchez (1954) – Capt. Vance Colby
 Sitting Bull (1954) – Major Robert 'Bob' Parrish
 Top of the World (1955) – Maj. Lee Gannon
 Son of Sinbad (1955) – Sinbad
 The Ford Television Theatre (1956) - Donny Weaver (1 episode, "The Face")
 A Day of Fury (1956) – Jagade
 Dakota Incident (1956) – John Banner
 High Terrace (1956) – Bill Lang
 Schlitz Playhouse of Stars (1956) - Jim Hardie (1 episode, A Tale of Wells Fargo)
 A Tall Trouble (1957) – Sheriff Caleb Wells
 Tales of Wells Fargo (1957-1962) - Jim Hardie (all 201 episodes)
 Anna of Brooklyn (1958) – Raffaele
 Gunfight at Black Horse Canyon (1961, TV movie) – Jim Hardie
 Law of the Lawless (1964) – Judge Clem Rogers
 Blood on the Arrow (1964) – Wade Cooper
 The Man from Button Willow (1965) – Justin Eagle (voice)
 Coast of Skeletons (1965) – A. J. Magnus
 The Hollywood Squares (1966) - Himself (5 episodes)
 Scalplock (1966, TV movie) – Benjamin Calhoun (a repackaging of the series pilot of Iron Horse)
 The One Eyed Soldiers (1966) – Richard Owen
 Iron Horse (1966-1968) - Benjamin Calhoun (all 48 episodes)
 The Dean Martin Show (1969) - Himself (1 episode)
 Death Valley Days (1969-1970) - Host (26 episodes)
 East Connection (1970)
 Aru heishi no kake (The Walking Major, 1970) – Major Clark J. Allen
 The Six Million Dollar Man(1974) - Himself (1 episode)
 Melvin Purvis: G-Man (1974, TV movie) - Melvin Purvis
 The Kansas City Massacre (1975, TV movie) – Melvin Purvis
 Fantasy Island (1979) - Peter Dawlings (1 episode)
 The Last Ride of the Dalton Gang (1979, TV movie) - Judge Isaac Charles Parker
 The Love Boat (1980) - Mason Fleers (1 episode)
 Dynasty (1981) - Walter Lankershim (9 episodes)
 Dallas (1982) - Frank Crutcher (5 episodes)
 The New Hollywood Squares (1987) - Himself (1 episode)
 J.J. Starbuck (1987-1988) - J.J. Starbuck (all 16 episodes)
 Murder, She Wrote (1988-1989) - Col. Lee Goddard (2 episodes, uncredited)
 Wind in the Wire (1993, TV movie)
 Harts of the West (1993-1994) - Zeke (3 episodes, final role)

Radio appearances

References

External links

Dale Robertson biographical sketch
IMDb entry for the episode of The Six Million Dollar Man'' in which Dale Robertson appeared

1923 births
2013 deaths
20th-century American male actors
American male boxers
American male film actors
American male television actors
Classen School of Advanced Studies alumni
Deaths from lung cancer
Deaths from pneumonia in California
Male Western (genre) film actors
Male actors from Los Angeles
Male actors from Oklahoma
Military personnel from Oklahoma
People from Oklahoma County, Oklahoma
People from Yukon, Oklahoma
Ranchers from Oklahoma
Recipients of the Silver Star
United States Army officers
United States Army personnel of World War II
United States Army soldiers
Western (genre) television actors